Fresh Sounds From Middle America (vol 2) was the second in a series of compilations featuring bands from the Midwest region of America.  Volume 2 was a split compilation cassette-only release featuring 18 tracks from 5 bands.

The "Fresh Sounds" series was organized by Bill Rich, of Talk Talk magazine, as a way to promote regional bands nationally.

Track listing / personnel

Side 1

Side 2

Reception
Snippets of the review from "The Offense": 
The Buckthrusters: "lots of synths plus accordion, guitar, bass and drums, and these guys really had a good thing going (gone now)"
The New Wave Brothers: "a rap, a nap and a pile of crap"
Color Entertainment: "as dull for me as it was for the live audience assembled"
Monte Montclaire: "an overweight conceptualist who taped his voice and added echo"
C. Lucas Experience: "an underweight conceptualist obsessed with going either deaf or blind"

References

External links

New Wave Brothers myspace

1981 compilation albums
Post-punk compilation albums
Split albums
Record label compilation albums
Fresh Sounds Records albums